Garra blanfordii is a species of ray-finned fish in the genus Garra from Eritrea, Sudan and Ethiopia, in Ethiopa it is abundant in the basin of the Abbay River.

References 

Garra
Taxa named by George Albert Boulenger
Fish described in 1901